Vichoor is a village in North Chennai, a metropolitan city in Tamil Nadu, India. Most of the people from this area is migrating to the nearby township at Manali New Town for a safer residence.

References

Neighbourhoods in Chennai